Freemium, a portmanteau of the words "free" and "premium," is a pricing strategy by which a basic product or service is provided free of charge, but money (a premium) is charged for additional features, services, or virtual (online) or physical (offline) goods that expand the functionality of the free version of the software. This business model has been used in the software industry since the 1980s. A subset of this model used by the video game industry is called free-to-play.

Origin 
The business model has been in use for software since the 1980s. The term freemium to describe this model appears to have been created only much later, in response to a 2006 blog post by venture capitalist Fred Wilson summarizing the model:Give your service away for free, possibly ad supported but maybe not, acquire a lot of customers very efficiently through word of mouth, referral networks, organic search marketing, etc., then offer premium-priced value-added services or an enhanced version of your service to your customer base.Jarid Lukin of Alacra, one of Wilson's portfolio companies, then suggested the term "freemium" for this model.

In 2009, Chris Anderson published the book Free, which examines the popularity of this business model. As well as for traditional proprietary software and services, it is now also often used by Web 2.0 and open source companies. In 2014, Eric Seufert published the book Freemium Economics, which attempts to deconstruct the economic principles of the freemium model and prescribe a framework for implementing them into software products.

The freemium model is closely related to tiered services. Notable examples include LinkedIn, Badoo, Discord, and in the form of a "soft" paywall, such as those employed by The New York Times and by La Presse+. This is often in a time-limited or feature-limited version to promote a paid-for full version. The model is particularly suited to software as the cost of distribution is negligible.

A freemium model is sometimes used to build a consumer base when the marginal cost of producing extra units is low. Thus little is lost by giving away free software licenses as long as significant cannibalization is avoided. Other examples include free-to-play games – video games that can be downloaded without paying. Video game publishers of free-to-play games rely on other means to generate revenue – such as optional in-game virtual items that can be purchased by players to enhance gameplay or aesthetics.

Types of product limitations 
Ways in which the product or service may be limited or restricted in the free version include:
 Limited features: A free video chat client may not include three-way video calling. Most free-to-play games fall into this category, as they offer virtual items that are either impossible or very slow to purchase with in-game currency but can be instantly purchased with real-world money.
 Limited capacity: For example, SQL Server Express is restricted to databases of 10 GB or less.
 Limited use license: For example, most Autodesk or Microsoft software products with full features are free for students with an educational license. (See: Microsoft Imagine.) Some apps, like CCleaner, are free for personal use only.
 Limited use time: Most free-to-play games permit the user to play the game consecutively for a limited number of levels or turns; the player must either wait a period time to play more or purchase the right to play more.
 Limited support: Priority or real-time technical support may not be available for non-paying users. For example, Comodo offers all its software products free of charge. Its premium offerings only add various kinds of technical support.
 Limited or no access to online services that are only available by purchasing periodic subscriptions

Some software and services make all of the features available for free for a trial period, and then at the end of that period revert to operating as a feature-limited free version (e.g. Online Armor Personal Firewall). The user can unlock the premium features on payment of a license fee, as per the freemium model. Some businesses use a variation of the model known as "open core", in which the unsupported, feature-limited free version is also open-source software, but versions with additional features and official support are commercial software.

Significance 
In June 2011, PC World reported that traditional anti-virus software had started to lose market share to freemium anti-virus products. By September 2012, all but two of the 50 highest-grossing apps in the Games section of Apple's iTunes App Store supported in-app purchases, leading Wired to conclude that game developers were now required to choose between including such purchases or foregoing a very substantial revenue stream. Beginning in 2013, the digital distribution platform Steam began to add numerous free-to-play and early-access games to its library, many of which utilized freemium marketing for their in-game economies. Due to criticism that the multiplayer games falling under this category were pay-to-win in nature or were low-quality and never finished development, Valve has since added stricter rules to its early-access and free-to-play policies.

Criticism of freemium games 

Freemium games have come under criticism from players and critics. Many are labelled with the derogatory term 'pay-to-win', which criticizes freemium games for giving an advantage to players who pay more money, as opposed to those who have more skill. Criticisms also extend to the way that the business model can often appear unregulated, to the point of encouraging prolific spending. Freemium games are often designed in a manner where players who are not actively using premium features are actively frustrated, delayed or require much larger investments in time required to acquire currency or upgrades.

In November 2014, the animated TV series South Park aired an episode entitled "Freemium Isn’t Free". The episode satirized the business model for encouraging predatory game design tactics based on an improper business model. In 2015, Nintendo released two of their own freemium games in the Pokémon series based on other standalone purchasable titles.  With the title Pokémon Rumble World, Nintendo took a different approach by making it possible to complete the entire game without buying premium credits, but retaining them as an option so players can proceed through the game at a pace that suits them.

See also 

 Business models for open-source software
 Crippleware
 Pay to play
 Pay what you want
 Shareware
 Threshold pledge system

References

Further reading 
 
  
  

Business models
Neologisms
2000s neologisms
Portmanteaus
Revenue models